The Harmony James EP  is the first recording by Harmony and features her breakthrough single "Tailwind".
According to an article in Capital News magazine, "Tailwind was the first Australian song ever to win the country category of the International Songwriting Competition, and it blew the judges - including Rosanne Cash - out of the water".
The second single "Somebody Stole My Horse" became Australia's second most played country song in 2008.
The EP has become somewhat of a collectors item and features the song "Big News" which is unavailable on any other recording.
 Track Listing

 Produced and engineered by Herm Kovac

Personnel
Rudy Miranda: drums
Ian Lees: bass
James Gillard:acoustic guitar, backing vocals
Glenn Hannah: electric guitars
Duncan Toombs: electric guitars
Michel Rose: pedal steel, mandolin
Mick Albeck: fiddle
Shanley Del: backing vocals

References
https://web.archive.org/web/20130427073019/http://www.capitalnews.com.au/editorial.asp?editorial_id=1614&issue=117
http://www.countryragepage.com/harmony.htm

2007 EPs